Lee Williamson is a British male lawn bowler.

Bowls career
Williamson became the English champion when he won the singles tournament during the 2014 National Championships.

He bowls for Cheltenham Bowling Club and was previously with the Tenby Bowling Club.

References

Living people
English male bowls players
Year of birth missing (living people)